The Sentischhorn (also spelled Sentisch Horn) (2,827 m) is a mountain of the Albula Alps, located east of Davos in the canton of Graubünden. It lies on the range west of the Flüela Pass, that culminates at the Flüela Schwarzhorn.

References

External links
 Sentischhorn on Hikr
 Sentischhorn (2,827 m) on freeride

Mountains of Graubünden
Mountains of the Alps
Mountains of Switzerland
Two-thousanders of Switzerland